Lophocochlias parvissimus is a species of sea snail, a marine gastropod mollusk in the family Tornidae.

Description
The height of the shell attains 1 mm, its diameter 0.9 mm.
The very small, white shell is umbilicate, turbinate, not nacreous, with a conic brownish spire. The first whorl appears to be smooth. On the second whorl fine radial folds or puckering appears below the suture, becoming coarser on the following whorl. The body whorl has six strong, smooth spiral keels, narrower than the intervals, which are flat and crossed by numerous retractively axial threads, which are much narrower than their intervals. Within the umbilicus, two rather small spiral cords are visible. The aperture is quite oblique and subcircular. The outer lip is strengthened by a rounded external rib or varix a short distance behind the edge.

Distribution
This marine species occurs in the Pacific Ocean off Hawaii and Tuvalu.

References

 Kay, E.A. (1979) Hawaiian marine shells. Reef and shore fauna of Hawaii. Section 4: Mollusca. Bernice P. Bishop Museum Special Publications, 64, xviii + 1–653
 Tröndlé, J. (1986). Premieres donnees en ecologie et faunistique sur la microfauna malacologique de Tahiti (Société - Polynésie française). Haliotis. 15, 61-72.

External links
 Hedley C. (1899). The Mollusca of Funafuti. Part I - Gasteropoda. Memoirs of the Australian Museum. 3(7): 395-488, pl. 27
 Rubio F. & Rolán E. (2015). The genus Lophocochlias Pilsbry, 1921 (Gastropoda, Tornidae) in the Indo-West Pacific. Novapex. 16(4): 105-120

parvissimus
Gastropods described in 1921